Elettra (A 5340) is an Italian Navy SIGINT vessel designated as 'Nuova Unità Polivalente di Supporto (NUPS).
Designed to carry out research and surveillance activities, the vessel’s platform was developed from the RV Alliance built for NATO.
Her propulsion system, based on two permanent magnet electric engines, constitutes a technological breakthrough and she is the first surface vessel in the world to be powered by this type of engine. The main characteristics of this propulsion system are: high reliability, high efficiency, low maintenance and low underwater radiated noise

Characteristics 
The vessel is fitted with:
advanced electronic intelligence gear, including 27 various electronic and acoustic reconnaissance systems
submersible ROV, which can operate at a maximum depth of 1,000 meters
echo sounder 
a rear flight deck can deploy unmanned aerial vehicles
1 x compression chamber DRASS Galeazzi for 8 persons

Ships

References

External links

 Elettra (A 5340) Marina Militare website

Auxiliary ships of the Italian Navy
2002 ships
Ships built by Fincantieri
Ships built in Italy
Electronic intelligence ships